Bilgola Beach is a suburb in northern Sydney, in the state of New South Wales, Australia 33 kilometres north-east of the Sydney central business district, in the local government area of Northern Beaches Council. It is part of the Northern Beaches region. It and Bilgola Plateau were gazetted as suburbs in 2012 dividing the previous suburb of Bilgola.

Location
Bilgola Beach is located on the Tasman Sea side of the Barrenjoey Peninsula between Avalon Beach to the north and Newport to the south. The land rises steeply behind Bilgola Beach to Bilgola Plateau and then descends to Clareville on the western side of the peninsula.

History
The name "Bilgola" is derived from an Aboriginal term Belgoula meaning "swirling waters", or perhaps "a pretty beach with steep slopes, studded with cabbage palms". The word Belgoula was noted in Surveyor James Meehan's records of 1814. The district eventually adopted the simplified name "Bilgola".

The area was owned by the McLurcan family from the start of the early 1900s. Mrs McLurcan was famous for her cookery book, 'Mrs McLurcan's Cookery Book'. The large family home was surrounded by cabbage tree palms, for which the area is noted.

There were plans during the 1960s to build a bridge bypass of the twisting road ('Bilgola Bends') between the north and south headlands of Bilgola. The bridge was not built but a small amount of landfill was added to remove a sharp bend in the southern end of the road in preparation for construction. The bend still remains, with the landfill now providing a small grassy area, with an excellent view of Newport Beach.

Demographics
According to the 2011 census of Population, there were 3,863 residents in Bilgola (now the suburbs of Bilgola Beach and Bilgola Plateau). 71.7% of people were born in Australia. The most common other countries of birth were England 9.4%, New Zealand 1.7%, United States of America 1.4%, South Africa 1.0% and Germany 1.0%. 89.7% of people only spoke English at home. Other languages spoken at home included German 1.5%, Italian 0.6%, French 0.6%, Swedish 0.4% and Dutch 0.4%. The most common responses for religion in Bilgola were No Religion 27.8%, Anglican 24.9%, Catholic 21.2%, Uniting Church 4.1% and Presbyterian and Reformed 3.6%.

Transport
The main road connecting the northern part of the Barrenjoey Peninsula to the rest of Sydney, Barrenjoey Road, runs through Hewitt Park along the cliff line between Bilgola headland and Bilgola South headland. The road separates Bilgola Plateau from Bilgola Beach.

Sport and recreation 
Bilgola Surf Life Saving Club is located at Bilgola Beach. It was formed in the summer of 1949 with construction of the club house beginning in 1950.

Avalon Bilgola Amateur Swimming Club swims at the Bilgola Rock Pool on Saturday mornings during the summer months.  The club was formed in 1961.

References

External links 

 Bilgola, from Beachnet
 Bilgola Surf Lifesaving Club
 Avalon Bilgola Amateur Swimming Club

Suburbs of Sydney
Beaches of New South Wales
Northern Beaches Council